The Founders' Cup is the championship trophy of Canada's Junior "B" lacrosse leagues. The custodial duties of this trophy fall upon the Canadian Lacrosse Association. The national champions are determined through a round robin format with a playdown for the final.

History
The original Founders Cup was inaugurated in 1972 by the CLA in honour of "the founders of organized lacrosse," especially "The Father of Organized Lacrosse", William George Beers of Montreal, Quebec.  Dr. Beers wrote the first rulebook of the sport and was key to the organizing the National Lacrosse Association in 1867, the forerunner of the CLA.

Competitive leagues
Alberta - Rocky Mountain Lacrosse League
British Columbia - Pacific Northwest Junior Lacrosse League, Thompson Okanagan Junior Lacrosse League, West Coast Junior Lacrosse League
First Nations - First Nations Junior B Lacrosse League
Manitoba - Rocky Mountain Lacrosse League
Nova Scotia - East Coast Junior Lacrosse League
Ontario - OLA Junior B Lacrosse League
Quebec - Fédération de crosse du Québec, Ontario Junior C Lacrosse League
Saskatchewan - Prairie Gold Lacrosse League, Rocky Mountain Lacrosse League

Founders' Cup Champions
  
(*) denotes in 1972, the Founders Cup was awarded to the Junior "C" Champion instead of the Junior "B" Champion.

References

External links
Founders' Cup
Founders' Cup modern history by Vernon Tigers

Lacrosse competitions in Canada
Lacrosse trophies and awards
Canadian sports trophies and awards